Jason James Taylor (born 28 January 1987) is an English footballer who plays as a midfielder for Barrow.

Career
Born in Droylsden, Greater Manchester, Taylor began his career as a trainee at Oldham Athletic in October 2005. However, he made no appearances for Oldham before joining Stockport County on loan in March 2006. He signed a permanent two-year contract with Stockport County in August 2006, and then signed a new two-year in January 2007, with manager Jim Gannon saying, "He has all the attributes in terms of stamina and work-rate, plus he is mobile and we keep trying to add to his game. He has grown in confidence and he could be a fantastic player. He might out-grow us but I like to think we are bringing in players that will grow with this club. We think he's going to be an important player for us for a number of years and I'm delighted he's extended his contract." He made 51 league and cup appearances for Stockport in the 2006–2007 season, and won the club's Young Player of the Year award at the end of the season.

Rotherham United
Taylor joined Rotherham United on a free transfer in January 2009, signing a -year contract. He made his debut in the 1–0 win over AFC Bournemouth at Don Valley Stadium, he got his first goal in the 3–2 win over Morecambe which was also at Don Valley.

Rochdale (loan)
Taylor went on loan to Rochdale for the 2009–10 season. He scored his first goal for Rochdale on 5 December 2009 against Macclesfield.

Cheltenham Town
On 28 January, Jason Taylor has had his contract with Rotherham United terminated by mutual consent, and joined Cheltenham Town. He made his first appearance for the club in a 2–1 win over Torquay United. He was placed on the transfer list in the summer of 2014, but after a number of impressive pre-season games, rumours began spreading he would stay at the club.

Northampton Town
On 1 January, Jason Taylor joined Northampton Town on a loan deal.

Eastleigh
On 16 August 2016, Jason Taylor joined National League Eastleigh from League One Northampton Town.

AFC Fylde
In October 2017, Jason Taylor joined fellow National League side AFC Fylde from Eastleigh.

Barrow
In July 2018, Taylor moved on again, joining National League Barrow. He was the Bluebirds Player of the Year in 2018/2019, and formed part of the team that won the National League in 2020, gaining promotion to League Two.

Career statistics

References

External links

1987 births
Living people
People from Droylsden
Footballers from Greater Manchester
English footballers
Association football midfielders
Oldham Athletic A.F.C. players
Stockport County F.C. players
Rotherham United F.C. players
Rochdale A.F.C. players
Cheltenham Town F.C. players
Northampton Town F.C. players
Eastleigh F.C. players
AFC Fylde players
Barrow A.F.C. players
English Football League players
National League (English football) players